Stefan Ciekański (born 29 May 1958) is a Polish former cyclist. He competed in the team time trial event at the 1980 Summer Olympics.

References

External links
 

1958 births
Living people
Polish male cyclists
Olympic cyclists of Poland
Cyclists at the 1980 Summer Olympics
Sportspeople from Łódź